Moneypoint power station is Ireland's largest electricity generation station (output 915 MW) and only coal-fired power station. Commissioned between 1985 and 1987, it is located on the River Shannon near Kilrush, County Clare. It was constructed at a cost of more than £700m in one of the largest capital projects in the history of the state. The station operates largely on coal, making it both unique in the context of Irish electricity production and the country's single largest emitter of greenhouse gases. It is capable of meeting around 25% of customer demand across the country. It has two Heavy Fuel Oil (HFO) storage tanks with a capacity of 50,000 tonnes which can be used as a back-up fuel if required.

Three Brown Boveri four-cylinder, single-shaft impulse reaction turbines are directly connected to three generators which generate the power. The steam is generated by three Foster Wheeler two-pass boilers, which convert water into high pressure steam by combustion of the coal.

The power station chimneys, at 218m, are the tallest free-standing structures in Ireland.

History

Moneypoint was under construction from 1979 to 1987. Before its construction, Ireland depended heavily on imported oil for its energy. The 1970s sharp increase in oil prices over a short period of time led the government and the Electricity Supply Board to choose coal as a fuel, as it was seen as a plentiful resource with a stable price.

A flywheel synchronous condenser to stabilize the grid was ordered for operation at Moneypoint by 2022.

In 2019, the government launched its climate action plan which included a commitment to end the burning of coal in Moneypoint by 2025, and replace coal-fired generation with "low-carbon and renewable technologies". One option being explored is a 400 MW floating wind farm with an onshore hydrogen facility.

References

External links

Official Information Sheet (PDF)
Flickr photos

Coal-fired power stations in the Republic of Ireland